The Ministry of Trade was a government department of Greece. From August 8, 1991 until September 15, 1995 the Minister for Trade was also Minister for Industry, Energy and Technology. From February 1, 1996, the Ministry of Trade was officially merged with the Ministry for Industry, Energy and Technology and the Ministry for Tourism to create the Ministry for Development.

Ministers for Trade (1974–1995)

See also
 Cabinet of Greece

Defunct government ministries of Greece
Lists of government ministers of Greece
Greece